Morning sun may refer to:

Sun, the Solar System's star
Sunrise

Places in the United States
Morning Sun, Iowa
Morning Sun Township, Louisa County, Iowa
Morning Sun, Ohio

Music
Morning Sun (album), by Barbara Mandrell, 1990
Morning Sun (EP), by the Beautiful Girls, 2002
"Morning Sun" (Robbie Williams song), 2010
"Morning Sun" (Robin Thicke song), 2015
 "Morning Sun", a song by the Spencer Davis Group from With Their New Face On, 1968

Newspapers
The Morning Sun, Pittsburg, Kansas, US
Morning Sun, published by Judson King in Denison, Texas, US

Other uses
Morning Sun (film), a 2003 American documentary about China's Cultural Revolution
Morning Sun, a 1952 painting by Edward Hopper
Morning Sun, a 1963 off-Broadway musical with a book by Fred Ebb